Bung Karno Sports Arena (known as Gelora Bung Karno Sports Complex), formerly named Senayan Sports Arena from 1969 to 2001 and Asian Games Complex on its early days, is a sports complex located in Gelora, Central Jakarta, Indonesia. It is usually misperceived to be located at Senayan, South Jakarta, hence its former name.  The sports complex hosts main stadium, secondary stadium, the Sports Palace, football fields, aquatic stadium, tennis stadiums (indoor and outdoor), hockey, baseball and archery fields, and several indoor gymnasiums. The complex was built in 1960 for the 1962 Asian Games and recently underwent a major reconstruction for the 2018 Asian Games and Asian Para Games.

The sports complex host a main stadium with a capacity of 77,193 seats, athletic stadium, football fields, aquatic stadium, tennis stadiums (indoor and outdoor), hockey, baseball and archery fields, and several indoor gymnasiums. It is named after Sukarno, Indonesia's first president and the sitting president during its development and initial opening. It is the largest and one of the oldest sport complex in Jakarta and Indonesia, and also one of the largest in Southeast Asia. The Gelora Bung Karno Stadium is the main building within this sports complex. The abbreviation Gelora also means "vigorous" (like the flame or ocean wave) in Indonesian language.

Other than hosting numbers of sports facilities, the sports complex is also a popular place for people of Jakarta to do physical exercises; jogging, bicycling, aerobics and calisthenics especially during weekend.

History

After the Asian Games Federation declared Jakarta to host the 1962 Asian Games in 1958, the minimum requirement that yet to be met by the Jakarta was the availability of a multi-sport complex. In response to this, President Sukarno issued Presidential Decree No. 113/1959 dated 11 May 1959 about the establishment of the Asian Games Council of Indonesia (DAGI) led by Minister of Sports Maladi. Sukarno, as an architect and civil engineering graduate, proposed a location near M. H. Thamrin Boulevard and Menteng, namely the area of Karet, Pejompongan, or Dukuh Atas. Friedrich Silaban, a renowned architect who accompanied Sukarno to review the location by helicopter, disagreed with the selection of Dukuh Atas because he argued the construction of a sports complex in the center the future downtown area will potentially create a massive traffic congestion. Sukarno agreed and instead assigned the Senayan area with an area of approximately 300 hectares.

The first pole erection was done symbolically by Sukarno on 8 February 1960. Construction of Istora was completed in May 1961. The secondary stadium, Swimming Stadium and Tennis Stadium followed in December 1961. The main stadium was completed on 21 July 1962, a month before the games.

Facilities

Sports venues

Other buildings

Other buildings inside the complex 
 Jakarta Convention Center (completed 1974)
 Al Bina mosque (completed 2001)
 Jakarta Sultan Hotel (formerly Hilton Hotel Jakarta, completed 1971)
 Mulia Hotel (completed 1994)
 Krida Loka Park (completed 1987)
 City Forest (completed 2018, stands on what was the Senayan Golf Course & Driving Range)
Initially the sports complex covers much larger area than it is today. During the 1980s to 1990s, several land plots were developed into non-sport facilities. Northern area were developed into government offices while the southern area were developed into hotels and shopping malls. The complex also had  radio-controlled car circuit northwest of the main stadium, which was scrapped during the 2017 renovation.

Northern area 
 DPR/MPR Building (completed 1968)
 TVRI Headquarters (completed 1962)
 Ministry of Youth and Sports office (completed 1983)
 National Forestry Museum (Manggala Wanabakti, formerly Ministry of Forestry office, completed 1983)

Southern area 
The southern area was originally an athlete village for the 1962 Asian Games. The village was demolished in the 1970s. Several buildings now stood in their location.
 Century Park Hotel (completed 1990)
 Ratu Plaza (completed 1982)
 Plaza Senayan (completed 1996)
 Senayan Trade Center (completed 2006)
 Senayan City (completed 2006)
 fX Sudirman (completed 2008)
 Fairmont Jakarta Hotel (completed 2015)
 Multipurpose Building (completed 1987)

Demolished buildings or facilities
Remote controlled-car racing circuit
Asia Afrika Sports Hall
Volleyball Arena that was used during the 1962 Asian Games
18 tennis courts located southern of the tennis stadiums.
Roller sports court
Gymnastics Building
Cemaratiga Softball Field
Senayan Golf Range
Street Dirt Senayan

Sporting events

For the first time, the sports complex was host fourth Asian Games in 1962. The main stadium hosted the 2007 AFC Asian Cup. Other competitions held there were several AFF Championship finals and domestic cup finals. The Istora hosted numbers of BWF World Championships, Sudirman Cup, Thomas Cup and Uber Cup badminton competitions. The tennis stadium hosted most of Indonesia's home matches at the Davis Cup and Fed Cup.

The sports complex hosted multi-event sport such as Pekan Olahraga Nasional (PON, National Sports Week) and Southeast Asian Games (SEA Games). The complex hosted the PON seven times between 1973 and 1996. The complex hosted the SEA Games in 1979, 1987, 1997 and 2011; the latter was co-hosted with Jakabaring Sport City complex in Palembang. It also hosted 2018 Asian Games along with Palembang's complex and some other venues across Palembang, Banten, Greater Jakarta and West Java, while it served only with other venues across Greater Jakarta and West Java during the subsequent Para Games.

The main stadium is projected to host some matches during the 2021 FIFA U-20 World Cup. The 2023 FIBA Basketball World Cup will be held at a new 17.150 seater arena within the sports complex known as Indonesia Arena; Indonesia will co-host it with Japan and the Philippines.

Notes

References

Bibliography

External links

  

Sports venues in Jakarta
Venues of the 2018 Asian Games
Sports venues completed in 1962
Post-independence architecture of Indonesia
Sports complexes in Indonesia
Swimming venues in Jakarta
Baseball venues in Asia
Rugby union stadiums in Indonesia
Asian Games water polo venues